Nancy L. Ward was the Interim Administrator of the Federal Emergency Management Agency (FEMA), hand-picked by her predecessor, R. David Paulison to serve in his place after retiring on January 21, 2009. Prior to her selection by Paulison, Ward served as the FEMA regional director for region IX (which serves AZ, CA, Guam, HI, NV, CNMI, RMI, FSM and American Samoa). She returned to this position in May 2009 after Craig Fugate was appointed as Administrator.

Biography
Ward had served as the regional director for region IX since October, 2006. Prior to that, she had served as the administrator of FEMA's Response and Recovery Division in the same region for almost six years.

Ward has served in two details at FEMA headquarters as the Deputy Director of the Recovery Directorate during FEMA's response and recovery operations for the 2004 and 2005 hurricane seasons. She also served in various senior management positions in more than 20 disasters, most recently during the March and April 2006 severe storms, flooding, landslides and mudslides in California, and the earthquake in Hawaii. Ward has received awards for special accomplishments at FEMA, including the 2007 Award for Excellence for her leadership during the California wildfires.

Before joining FEMA, Ward was Chief of the Disaster Assistance Branch and Deputy State Coordinating Officer for the California Office of Emergency Services. She administered the state's Natural Disaster Assistance Act program assistance provisions, which provide disaster assistance funding to local governments for state-level emergencies and disasters.

References

Federal Emergency Management Agency officials
Living people
1950s births
Year of birth uncertain